The National Intelligence and Security Agency (NISA) ( (وكالة المخابرات والأمن الوطنية) )(HSNQ)) is the national intelligence agency of the Federal Republic of Somalia. It is headquartered in Mogadishu. The NISA is also closely intertwined with the Somali Armed Forces and regularly cooperates with them.
	
The agency was established in January 2013 by the new Federal Government of Somalia in place of the defunct National Security Service. 
	
The agency is assisted by the African Union Mission in Somalia. According to the former Minister of State for the Presidency Abdulkadir Moallin Noor, the U.S. Central Intelligence Agency also provided training to NISA officials during the latter agency's formative stages.
	
NISA personnel have conducted security operations against Al-Shabaab elements in the capital.

Counterterrorism  and paramilitary forces
In April 2014, the United Arab Emirates donated several battle wagons and other equipment to NISA. By July 2014, the Gaashaan ("Shield") unit was being reported as part of the National Intelligence and Security Agency. It is a commando force trained by the United States. NISA associates indicate that Gaashaan consists of two units totaling 120 men.

Alpha Group is Gaashan's first component, and includes around 40 soldiers and 3 officers who were chosen from amongst 190 special Somali National Army troops. According to Somali defense officials, this unit received training in the United States between late 2009 and early 2010. Derek Gannon said that the Alpha Group's training regimen includes counter-insurgency, counter-terror operation and executive-protecting, with an emphasis on quick reaction in an urban environment. The soldiers are also equipped with guns with night-vision scopes.

Gaashaan's second counter-terrorism unit is the Bravo Group. It received training at the Aden Adde International Airport (Mogadishu Airport) in 2011.

Abdullah Mohamed Ali "Sanbaloolshe" an elected MP of the national lower house of parliament, the House of the People, was on April 6, 2017 reappointed to the position of NISA Director General.

In May 2018 it was reported that the SNIS has grown to 700 personnel, with the Waran having 300 personnel and Gaashaan roughly 400.

Criticisms 

In January 2020, Dr Mohamed Haji Ingiriis, Research Fellow at the African Leadership Centre, King's College London, wrote in African Affairs that NISA 'normalize[s] extrajudicial activities to serve the agenda of political authorities and to suppress their critics.' In an article published by African Security Review in July 2020, he blamed 'an externally-imposed security architecture' for NISA's failure to counter Al Shabaab. According to Ali, since Yasin was appointed to head NISA operations have focussed on silencing political opposition and criticism rather than overcoming Al Shabaab.

Harassment of women in Gedo 
There have been allegations by women from the Gedo region, of arbitrary detention, torture and rape, against NISA officers from the regional office in Gedo, Jubaland, which was commanded by Abdullahi Aadam (Kulane Jiis)  at the time.

Harun Maruf 
In April 2020 NISA was accused of intimidation and harassment of Harun Maruf, a journalist who works with Voice of America, through Twitter. No viable evidence was produced by the said Journalist. His own credentials were placed in the fray where he "blindly parroted propaganda" from the then opposition leader Hassan Sheikh Mohamud.

Sacking of top officials 
In July 2021 Prime Minister Mohammed Hussein Roble dismissed head of NISA at Mogadishu's Aden Abdulle Airport Abdiwahab Sheikh Ali and NISA Chief of staff, Abdullahi Kulane after they refused to allow a group of passengers to fly from Mogadishu airport. { This move was widely agreed to be unconstitutional. Stated in the " Powers of the President" section of the constitution.}

Abduction of Ikran Tahlil Farah 

On 26 June 2021, NISA employee Ikran Tahlil Farah was abducted close to her home in Abdulaziz district of Mogadishu. NISA published a statement on 2 September, 2021 claiming that Ikran had been handed to Al Shabaab, who it claimed had then killed her, but Al Shabaab denied any involvement. Prime Minister Roble asked Director Gerneral of NISA, Fahad Yasin to submit a report on Ikran's death. Roble suspended Yasin due to his failure to submit the report, replacing him with Lt.Gen. Bashir Mohamed Jama, but the decision was overturned by President Mohamed on the grounds of it being unconstitutional. Roble accused Mohamed of “obstructing effective investigation of Ikran’s case”. Somalia's international partners called for a 'credible investigation of Ikran’s disappearance'. Ikran's mother, Qali Mohamud Gahaad filed charges at the military court, against Fahad Yasin, Abdullahi Kulane, Abdikani Wadna-Qabad and Yasin Faray in relation to the disappearance of her daughter.

On 8 September 2021, Villa Somalia announced that Fahad Yasin had resigned as head of NISA, however subsequently Mohamed appointed him as his National Security Advisor appointing Yasin Abdullahi as head of NISA. However, Roble had re-appointed Bashir Mohamed Jama to the position. The new administration has yet to mention this.

Equipment

See also 

Danab Brigade, commando formation of the Somali National Army

Notes

References
 http://www.nss.somaligov.net/about.html
 Somalia Re-Opens its National Intelligence & Security Agency

External links
PRESS RELEASE: AU Special Representative reaffirms AMISOM's continued support to the Somali National Intelligence and Security Agency (NISA)
Dan Joseph, Harun Maruf, U.S. Trained Somali Commandos Fight Against Al-Shabaab, Voice of America, July 31, 2014.
 Mohamed Haji Ingiriis, Predatory Politics and Personalization of Power: The Abuses and Misuses of the National Intelligence and Security Agency (NISA) in Somalia, African Affairs, 22 January 2020, https://doi.org/10.1093/afraf/adz027.
https://www.state.gov/reports/2020-country-reports-on-human-rights-practices/somalia/ -2020 State Department Human Rights report, includes mention of NISA 

Government agencies established in 2013
Somali intelligence agencies